Eucereon hoegei is a moth of the subfamily Arctiinae. It was described by Herbert Druce in 1884. It is found in Mexico.

References

 

hoegei
Moths described in 1884